The Ministry of Industry, Energy and Mining of Uruguay (MIEM) is a ministry of the Government of Uruguay that is responsible for formulating and promoting the industrial, energy and mining policies of the country.

The Ministry is headquartered in the Paysandú Street in Ciudad Vieja, Montevideo. The current Minister of Industry, Energy and Mining is Omar Paganini, who has held the position since March 1, 2020.

History 
In 1907, from the Ministry of Development, the President of the Republic Claudio Williman decided to create the Ministry of Industries, Labor and Public Instruction, it was responsible for livestock, agriculture, police, animal health, Immigration and colonization. The prime minister was Gabriel Terra.

In 1911, the name was changed to the Ministry of Industries, Labor and Communications and in 1935, after a reorganization of the Ministry, he began to take responsibility for Industry and Labor, until in 1967 his name was changed to the Ministry of Industries and Commerce . In 1974, in another reorganization process it was renamed Ministry of Industries and Energy, until in 1991 it received its current structure and was renamed Ministry of Industries, Energy and Mining.

Source:

List of Ministers of Industry, Energy and Mining 

¹ Ministers of the Military-Civic government (1973-1985).

See also 

 Mineral industry of Uruguay
 Energy in Uruguay

References 

Government ministries of Uruguay
Industry in Uruguay
Mining in Uruguay
Energy in Uruguay
1907 establishments in Uruguay